Palberta is an American indie rock band from New York City.

History
Palberta began when all three members were studying at Bard College. Their first full-length album, My Pal Berta, was released in 2013. Palberta released their second full-length album in 2014 titled Shitheads In The Ditch. In 2015, Palberta and the band No One and the Somebodies released a split album titled Chips For Dinner. In 2017, Palberta released their third full-length, Bye Bye Berta. In 2018, they released their fourth full-length album, Roach Goin' Down. The trio's next album, Palberta5000, was released on January 22, 2021.

Band members
Lily Konigsberg
Anina Ivry-Block 
Nina Ryser

Discography

Studio albums
My Pal Berta (2013, OSR Tapes)
Shitheads In The Ditch (2014, OSR Tapes)
Bye Bye Berta (2016, Wharf Cat)
Roach Goin' Down (2018, Wharf Cat)
Palberta5000 (2021, Wharf Cat)

Splits
Palberta / No One And The Somebodies - Chips For Dinner (Underdog Pop Records)
Palberta / New England Patriots - Special Worship (Feeding Tube Records)

References

Musical groups from New York City
Indie rock musical groups from New York (state)